ABC Sports is the former name of ESPN on ABC, a name of sports programs on the American Broadcasting Company in the United States.

ABC Sports may also refer to:

 ABC Sport, a sports programming division of the Australian Broadcasting Corporation in Australia
 One Sports, formerly known as ABC Sports, a sports programming division of The 5 Network in the Philippines